Malva cretica is a species of flowering plant in the family Malvaceae, native to Tunisia, Sardinia, Corsica, Sicily, Italy, Albania, Greece, the eastern Aegean Islands, Crete, Cyprus, and Turkey, and introduced to France. There may be a subspecies, Malva cretica subsp. althaeoides, present in Spain.

References

cretica
Flora of Corsica
Flora of Sardinia
Flora of Albania
Flora of Crete
Flora of Greece
Flora of Italy
Flora of Sicily
Flora of Cyprus
Flora of the East Aegean Islands
Flora of Turkey
Plants described in 1786
Flora of Malta
Taxa named by Antonio José Cavanilles